Jety-ata is a tradition among the Kazakh people, in which one is obligated to know or recite the names of at least seven direct blood ancestors such as father, grandfather, great grandfather and great-great-grandfather etc. This process often has been taught for generations from childhood by parents.

The main reason for knowing their seven ancestors is that among Kazakhs, marriage within seven generations is prohibited, so in order for a marriage to be licit, the ancestors of the male and female sides must be above the seven ancestors on both father and mother lineages. The second reason is that this tradition regarded a helpful means to know and remember the historical background of each Kazakh and their tribes in the past. This often called Shezhire by Kazakhs, and through this system most of the Kazakhs know their origin and the relations with other tribes within the clan-tribal system of Kazakhs. Each set of seven generations is considered as a minimum unit-clan in Kazakhs, but usually Kazakhs marry above ten ancestors. In the oral folklore of Kazakhs it is said that the new born child will be wise, healthy mental and physically strong under the "Jety-Ata" rule.

The "Jety-Ata" rule probably became entrenched after the Kazakh Khanate with the suggestions of Kazakh medical scientist Oteyboydak Tleukabyl uly (1388-1478) to the Khan of Kazakhs. Before the Kazakh Khanate it was common among the per-tribes of the Kazakhs.

Terminology

Kazakhs 
The naming method is as follows which starts from the grandson then descends to the further generations:

 Nemere - grandchild
 Shobere - great grandchild
 Shopshek - great-great-grandchild
 Nemene - 4th generations
 Jurezhat - 5th generations
 Tuazhat - 6th generations
 Juargat - 7th generations
 Jegzhat - 8th generations

 Жеті ата - 7th ancestry 
 Түп ата - 6th ancestry 
 Тек ата - great-great-great-grandfather
 Баба - great-great-grandfather
 Арғы ата - great grandfather
 Ата - grandfather
 Әке - father

 Жеті әже - 7th ancestry 
 Түп әже - 6th ancestry 
 Тек әже - great-great-great-grandmother
 Баба әже - great-great-grandmother
 Арғы әже - great grandmother
 Әже - grandmother
 Ана, шеше - mother

Other ethnicities 

 Bashkirs
 Бала - дитя, ребенок. Балам - (мое) дитя, (мой) ребенок
 Ейән, ейәнсәр — внук, внучка
 Бүлә, бүләсәр — правнук, правнучка
 Тыуа, тыуасар — праправнук, праправнучка
 Тыуаят — прапраправнук, прапраправнучка
 Һаратан — прапрапраправнук, прапрапраправнучка
 Етеят — прапрапрапраправнук, прапрапрапраправнучка
 Туңаяҡ — прапрапрапрапраправнук, прапрапрапрапраправнучка

 Kyrgyz (ancestors)
 Ата — father
 Чоң ата — grandfather
 Баба — great grandfather
 Буба — great-great-grandfather
 Кубар — great-great-great-grandfather
 Жото — great-great-great-great-grandfather
 Жете — great-great-great-great-great-grandfather

 Kyrgyz (descendants)
 Бала — child
 Небере — grandchild
 Чөбөрө — great grandchild
 Кыбыра — great-great-grandchild
 Тыбыра — great-great-great-grandchild
 Чүрпө — great-great-great-great-grandchild
 Урпак — great-great-great-great-great-grandchild

External links
Historical Dictionary of Kazakhstan on the Google online books
The Jety-Ata tradition of Kazakhs in Kazakh language
The Shezhire: Kazakh Family Tree

References

Kazakhstani culture
Kinship and descent